

2017 Orienteering World Cup
 May 25 – 28: Orienteering World Cup #1 in 
 Long winners:  Magne Dæhli (m) /  Tove Alexandersson (f)
 Middle winners:  Martin Regborn (m) /  Helena Jansson (f)
 Sprint winners:  Yannick Michiels (m) /  Maja Alm (f)
 Sprint Relay winners:  1 (Karolin Ohlsson, Emil Svensk, Jonas Leandersson, Helena Jansson)
 June 30 – July 8: Orienteering World Cup #2 in 
 Long winners:  Olav Lundanes (m) /  Tove Alexandersson (f)
 Middle winners:  Thierry Gueorgiou (m) /  Tove Alexandersson (f)
 Relay winners:  (Eskil Kinneberg, Olav Lundanes, Magne Dæhli) (m) /  (Emma Johansson, Helena Jansson, Tove Alexandersson)
 Sprint winners:  Daniel Hubmann (m) /  Maja Alm (f)
 Sprint Relay winners:  (Lina Strand, Jerker Lysell, Jonas Leandersson, Helena Jansson)
 August 25 – 27: Orienteering World Cup #3 in 
 Middle winners:  Olav Lundanes (m) /  Natalia Gemperle (f)
 Relay winners:  2 (Jonas Leandersson, Albin Ridefelt, William Lind) (m) /  1 (Elena Roos, Julia Gross, Sabine Hauswirth)
 Sprint winners:  Vojtěch Král (m) /  Tove Alexandersson (f)
 September 29 – October 1: Orienteering World Cup #4 (final) in

2017 MTB Orienteering World Cup
 June 2 – 5: MTB Orienteering World Cup Round 1 in 
 Middle winners:  Luca Dallavalle (m) /  Martina Tichovská (f)
 Sprint winners:  Kryštof Bogar (m) /  Emily Benham (f)
 Long winners:  Vojtech Ludvik /  Emily Benham (f)
 July 29 – August 5: MTB Orienteering World Cup Round 2 in 
 Sprint U21 winners:  Cedric Beill (m) /  Martina Tichovská (f)
 Middle U21 winners:  Jussi Laurila (m) /  Emily Benham (f)
 Long U21 winners:  Rasmus Søgaard (m) /  Olga Shipilova Vinogradova (f)
 August 20 – 26: MTB Orienteering World Cup Round 3 in 
 Middle winners:  Kryštof Bogar (m) /  Olga Shipilova Vinogradova (f)
 Long winners:  Rasmus Søgaard (m) /  Emily Benham (f)
 Sprint winners:  Grigory Medvedev (m) /  Marika Hara (f)

Continental & International Orienteering events
 February 7 – 12: European Ski Orienteering Championships 2017 in  
 Sprint winners:  Andrey Lamov (m) /  Tove Alexandersson (f)
 Mixed Sprint relay winners:  (Polina Frolova, Andrey Lamov)
 Long winners:  Andrey Lamov (m) /  Alena Trapeznikova (f)
 Middle winners:  Lars Moholdt (m) /  Tove Alexandersson (f)
 Relay winners:  (Martin Hammarberg, Ulrik Nordberg, Erik Rost) (m) /  (Alena Trapeznikova, Polina Frolova, Mariya Kechkina) (f)
 February 8 – 12: European Youth Ski Orienteering Championships 2017 in 
 Sprint winners:  Eerik Nurminen (m) /  Lea Widmer (f)
 Long winners:  Vaino Kotro (m) /  Veronika Kalinina (f)
 Middle winners:  Vaino Kotro (m) /  Veronika Kalinina (f)
 Relay winners:  (Vaino Kotro, Matias Maijala, Eerik Nurminen) (m) /  (Venla Taulavuori, Maria Hoskari, Siiri Saalo) (f)
 February 8 – 12: Junior World Ski Orienteering Championships 2017 in 
 Sprint winners:  Vladislav Kiselev (m) /  Liisa Nenonen (f)
 Long winners:  Vladislav Kiselev (m) /  Aleksandra Rusakova (f)
 Middle winners:  Vladislav Kiselev (m) /  Liisa Nenonen (f)
 Relay winners:  (Aleksandr Pavlenko, Vadim Ogorodnikov, Vladislav Kiselev) (m) /  (Tuuli Suutari, Veera Klemettinen, Liisa Nenonen) (f)
 February 9 – 12: World Masters Ski Orienteering Championships 2017 in 
 Long: For results, click here.
 Middle 1: For results, click here.
 Middle 2: For results, click here.
 February 22 – 26: 6th Mediterranean Championships in Orienteering in  Antalya
 Middle winners:  Artūrs Pauliņš (m) /  Anastasia Borovkova (f)
 Long winners:  Mattia Debertolis (m) /  Anastasia Borovkova (f)
 Sprint winners:  Mattia Debertolis (m) /  Irene Pozzebon (f)
 March 6 – 11: 2017 World Ski Orienteering Championships in  Krasnoyarsk
 Sprint relay winners:  Erik Rost (m) /  Tove Alexandersson (f)
 Sprint winners:  Ulrik Nordberg (m) /  Tove Alexandersson (f)
 Middle winners:  Stanimir Belomazhev (m) /  Tove Alexandersson (f)
 Long winners:  Erik Rost (m) /  Maria Kechkina (f)
 Relay winners:  (Andrey Grigoriev, Kirill Veselov, Andrey Lamov) (m) /  (Alena Trapeznikova, Polina Frolova, Maria Kechkina)
 April 14 – 17: 2017 Oceania Orienteering Championships in  Auckland
 Sprint winners:  Ross Morrison (m) /  Charlotte Watson (f)
 Middle winners:  Nick Hann (m) /  Charlotte Watson (f)
 Long winners:  Gene Beveridge (m) /  Jo Allison (f)
 Relay winners:  (Gene Beveridge, Matt Ogden, Nick Hann) /  (Natasha Key, Belinda Lawford, Jo Allison)
 April 22 – 28: World Schools Championship Orienteering 2017 in  Palermo
 Long: For results, click here.
 Middle: For results, click here.
 April 23 – 29: World Masters Orienteering Championships 2017 in  Auckland
 Sprint: For results, click here.
 Long: For results, click here.
 May 20: Baltic Orienteering Championships 2017 in 
 Winners:  Dimitry Mikhalkin (m) /  Anastasia Denisova (f)
 June 5 – 19: 2017 World Military Orienteering Championships in 
 Middle winners:  Timo Sild (m) /  Svetlana Mironova (f)
 Long winners:  Timo Sild (m) /  Svetlana Mironova (f)
 Relay winners:  1 (Dmitry Nakonechny, Valentin Novikov, Leonid Novikov) (m) /  (Agata Stankiewicz, Hanna Wisniewska, Aleksandra Hornik)
 June 29 – July 7: European Youth Orienteering Championships 2017 in  Banská Bystrica
 Long winners:  Piotr Rzeńca (U16) &  Jakub Dekret (U18) (m) /  Csilla Gárdonyi (U16) &  Anu Tuomisto (U18) (f)
 Sprint winners:  Antoine Becaert (U16) &  Guilhem Elias (U18) (m) /  Csilla Gárdonyi (U16) &  Eliane Deininger (U18) (f)
 Sprint Relay winners:
  1 (Julien Vuitton, Quentin Andrieux, Antoine Becaert (U16) (m) /  1 (Maria Maattanen, Melina Lahdenpera, Elisa Mattila) (U16) (f)
  1 (Alexandre Vergnaud, Pierre Erbland, Guilhem Elias) (U18) (m) /  1 (Siri Suter, Elena Pezzati, Eliane Deininger) (U18) (f)
 June 30 – July 8: 2017 World Orienteering Championships in  Tartu
 Long winners:  Olav Lundanes (m) /  Tove Alexandersson (f)
 Middle winners:  Thierry Gueorgiou (m) /  Tove Alexandersson (f)
 Relay winners:  (Eskil Kinneberg, Olav Lundanes, Magne Dæhli) (m) /  (Emma Johansson, Helena Jansson, Tove Alexandersson)
 Sprint winners:  Daniel Hubmann (m) /  Maja Alm (f)
 Sprint Relay winners:  (Lina Strand, Jerker Lysell, Jonas Leandersson, Helena Jansson)
 July 9 – 16: Junior World Orienteering Championships 2017 in 
 Middle distance winners:  Olli Ojanaho (m) /  Simona Aebersold (f)
 Sprint distance winners:  Olli Ojanaho (m) /  Simona Aebersold (f)
 Long distance winners:  Olli Ojanaho (m) /  Simona Aebersold (f)
 Relay winners:  1 (m) /  1 (f)
 July 10 – 15: World Trail Orienteering Championships in 
 TempO winner:  Vetle Ruud Bråten
 PreO winner:  Lars Jakob Waaler
 Relay winners:  (Emil Kacin, Mateja Keresteš, Krešo Keresteš)
 July 24 – 27: Orienteering at the World Games 2017 in  Wrocław
 Sprint winners:  Jerker Lysell (m) /  Maja Alm (f)
 Middle winners:  Matthias Kyburz (m) /  Helena Jansson (f)
 Sprint Relay  (Cecilie Friberg Klysner, Andreas Hougaard Boesen, Søren Bobach, Maja Alm)
 July 29 – August 5: European MTB Orienteering Championships in  
 Sprint U21 winners:  Cedric Beill (m) /  Martina Tichovská (f)
 Middle U21 winners:  Jussi Laurila (m) /  Emily Benham (f)
 Long U21 winners:  Rasmus Søgaard (m) /  Olga Shipilova Vinogradova (f)
 July 29 – August 5: 2017 Youth and Junior Championships in  
 Sprint U17 winners:  Jan Hašek (m) /  Lucie Rudkiewicz (f)
 Middle U17 winners:  Jan Hašek (m) /  Saara Yli-Hietanen (f)
 Long U17 winners:  Mikkel Brunstedt Nørgaard (m) /  Saara Yli-Hietanen (f)
 Sprint U20 winners:  Thomas Steinthal (m) /  Olga Mikhaylova (f)
 Middle U20 winners:  Adrian Jaeggi (f) /  Vilma Králová (f)
 Long U20 winners:  Thomas Steinthal (m) /  Elvira Larsson (f)
 Sprint U21 winners:  Cedric Beill (m) /  Martina Tichovská (f)
 Middle U21 winners:  Jussi Laurila (m) /  Emily Benham (f)
 Long U21 winners:  Rasmus Søgaard (m) /  Olga Shipilova Vinogradova (f)
 July 30 – August 4: World Masters MTB Orienteering Champinonships 2017 in  
 Day 1: For results, click here.
 Day 3: For results, click here.
 Day 4: For results, click here.
 August 20 – 26: World MTBO Championships 2017 in 
 Middle winners:  Kryštof Bogar (m) /  Olga Shipilova Vinogradova (f)
 Mass start winners:  Luca Dallavalle (m) /  Emily Benham (f)
 Relay winners:  (Vojtěch Stránský, Vojtech Ludvik, Kryštof Bogar) (m) /  (Ingrid Stengård, Antonia Haga, Marika Hara) (f)
 Long winners:  Rasmus Søgaard (m) /  Emily Benham (f)
 Sprint winners:  Grigory Medvedev (m) /  Marika Hara (f)
 August 20 – 26: Junior World MTBO Championships 2017 in 
 Middle winners:  Samson Deriaz (m) /  Veronika Kubinová (f)
 Mass start winners:  Thomas Steinthal (m) /  Viktorija Michnovič (f)
 Relay winners:  (Jesper Lindahl, Teemu Kaksonen, Sakari Puolakanaho) (m) /  (Kaarina Nurminen, Jutta Nurminen, Saara Yli-Hietanen) (f)
 Long winners:  Thomas Steinthal (m) /  Veronika Kubinová (f)
 Sprint winners:  Yuri Balev (m) /  Constance Devillers (f)
 August 20 – 25: 2nd Asian Junior & Youth Orienteering Championships in  Hailar District
 August 24 – 26: 2017 South East European Orienteering Championships in 
 Long U16 winners:  Valentin Neykov (m) /  Yasna Petrova (f)
 Middle U16 winners:  Alexandru Cătană (m) /  Evangelina Dyaksova (f)
 Sprint U16 winners:  Mihail Mihaylov (m) /  Yasna Petrova (f)
 Relay's U16 winners:  (Alexandru Cătană, Szikszai Csongor, Lorand Vigh) (m) /  (Niya Georgieva, Evangelina Dyaksova, Yasna Petrova)
 Long U18 winners:  Boyan Ivandjikov (m) /  Adela Gălăţeanu (f)
 Middle U18 winners:  Boyan Ivandjikov (m) /  Mariya Dermendzhieva (f)
 Sprint U18 winners:  Plamen Georgiev (m) /  Borislava Mitkova (f)
 Relay's U18 winners:  (Plamen Georgiev, Boyan Ivandjikov, Petar Borisov) (m) /  (Mariya Dermendzhieva, Elitsa Atanasova, Borislava Mitkova)
 Long U20 winners:  Miloš Bilić (m) /  Agnes Neda (f)
 Middle U20 winners:  Mihai Țînțar (m) /  Agnes Neda (f)
 Sprint U20 winners:  Mark Bogataj (m) /  Agnes Neda (f)
 Relay's U20 winners:  (Claudiu Rob, Mihai Țînțar, George Minoiu) (m) /  (Bianca Stamate, Roxana Culcean, Agnes Neda)
 Long U21 winners:  Ivan Sirakov (m) /  Iliana Ilieva (f)
 Middle U21 winners:  Ivan Sirakov (m) /  Iliana Ilieva (f)
 Sprint U21 winners:  Ivan Sirakov (m) /  Iliana Ilieva (f)
 Relay's U21 winners:  (Stefan Mihaylov, Ivaylo Kamenarov, Ivan Sirakov) (m) /  (Liliana Gotseva, Kristina Ivanova, Iliana Ilieva)

References

External links
 International Orienteering Federation Website

Orienteering
Outdoor locating games